The European Amateur Team Championship is a European amateur team golf championship for men organised by the European Golf Association which was introduced in 1959.

The championship was played in odd-numbered years from 1959 to 2007 and has been played annually since 2008 (with the exception of 2012).

Format

1959–1965
Each team consisted of a minimum of six players, playing two rounds of stroke play, counting the four best scores for each team. The four best teams formed flight A, were the winner was determined by a round-robin system. All teams in the flight met each other and the team with most points for team matches won the tournament, using the scale, won 2 points, halved 1 point, lost 0 points.

1967–1975
Each team played one round of stroke play, counted the five best scores for each team. The eight best teams formed flight A, in knock-out match play over the next three days, teams being seeded based on their position after the stroke play.

1977–2019
Each team consisted of 6 players, playing two rounds of stroke play over two days, counting the five best scores for each team, and two foursomes and five single matches in the following knock-out play.

From 2013, the number of participating teams was limited to 16. A second division, named European Men's Challenge Trophy, was introduced, giving the participating teams the opportunity to qualify for next year's championship, by finishing top three, replacing the three last finishing teams in the first division. The year after, the Challenge Trophy was renamed The European Amateur Team Championship Division 2.

2020
In 2020 only 14 team participated, each of four players. All competitors play a round of stroke play on the first day. The team score is based on the leading three scores of each team. After the first day, the leading eight teams compete in Flight A in knock-out match play over the next three days, teams being seeded based on their position after the stroke play. Contests consist of one foursome in the morning and two singles in the afternoon. If a match is level after 18 holes, extra holes are played to get a result, although if the overall result has already been determined later matches that are level after 18 holes are halved. The remaining teams, not qualified for Flight A, competed in a similar bracket in Flight B, to determine the final standings.

2021–present
Currently the championship is contested by up to 16 teams, each of 6 players.

The format consists of two rounds of stroke play, out of which the five lowest scores from each team's six players will count each day. The total addition of the five lowest scores will constitute the team's score and determine the teams qualified for the last three rounds of match play. Only teams in contention for a medal will play a match format of two foursomes and five singles, while the other teams will play a one foursome and four singles match format.

Results

Winning nations' summary

Source:

Winning teams
2022: Spain: David Puig, José Luis Ballester, Luis Masaveu, Quim Vidal, Javier Barcos, Alejandro Aguilera
2021: Denmark: Christoffer Bring, Hamish William Brown, Sebastian Friedrichsen, August Thor Høst, Frederik Kjettrup, Søren Broholt Lind
2020: Germany: Nick Bachem, Jannik De Bruyn, Marc Hammer, Matti Schmid
2019: Sweden: Ludvig Åberg, Albin Bergström, Vincent Norrman, David Nyfjäll, Pontus Nyholm, Christoffer Pålsson
2018: Finland: Matias Honkala, Jonatan Jolkkonen, Santeri Lehesmaa, Veeti Mähönen, Aleksi Myllymäki, Sami Välimäki
2017: Spain: Adri Arnaus, Alejandro del Rey, Manuel Elvira, Ángel Hidalgo, Victor Pastor, Javier Sainz
2016: Scotland: Grant Forrest, Craig Howie, Robert MacIntyre, Jamie Savage, Sandy Scott, Connor Syme
2015: Scotland: Ewen Ferguson, Grant Forrest, Greig Marchbank, Jack McDonald, Graeme Robertson, Connor Syme
2014: Spain: Pep Anglès, Daniel Berná, Emilio Cuartero, Mario Galiano, Scott Fernández, Jon Rahm
2013: England: Nathan Kimsey, Max Orrin, Garrick Porteous, Neil Raymond, Callum Shinkwin, Toby Tree
2011: France: Cyril Bouniol, Julien Brun, Édouard España, Sébastien Gros, Alexander Lévy, Gary Stal
2010: England: Laurie Canter, Tommy Fleetwood, Billy Hemstock, Tom Lewis, Chris Paisley, Eddie Pepperell
2009: Scotland:  Wallace Booth, Glenn Campbell, Gavin Dear, Ross Kellett, Paul O'Hara, Michael Stewart
2008: Ireland: Jonathan Caldwell, Paul Cutler, Niall Kearney, Shane Lowry, Paul O'Hanlon, Gareth Shaw
2007: Ireland: Jonathan Caldwell, Shane Lowry, Richard Kilpatrick, Rory McIlroy, Gareth Shaw, Simon Ward
2005: England:  Oliver Fisher, Gary Lockerbie, Jamie Moul, Matthew Richardson, Steven Tiley, Gary Wolstenholme
2003: Spain: Alejandro Cañizares, Gonzalo Fernández-Castaño, Sebastián García Grout, Alfredo García-Heredia, Pablo Martín, Álvaro Quirós
2001: Scotland:  Craig Heap, Barry Hume, Simon Mackenzie, Steven O'Hara, Marc Warren, Craig Watson
1999: Italy: Joachim Hassan, Roberto Paolillo, Stefano Reale, Michele Rigone, Massimiliano Secci, Andrea Zanini
1997: Spain: Juan Carlos Agüero, Sergio García, José Manuel Lara, Raúl Quirós, Oscar Sanchez, Juan Vizcaya
1995: Scotland: Stephen Gallacher, Barclay Howard, Hugh McKibbin, Graham Rankin, Alan Reid, Gordon Sherry
1993: Wales:  Richard Dinsdale, Bradley Dredge, Craig Evans, Richard Johnson, Michael Macara, Calvin O'Carroll
1991: England: Gary Evans, Ian Garbutt, Jim Payne, Andrew Sandywell, Ricky Willison, Liam White
1989: England: Russell Claydon, Andrew Hare, Peter McEvoy, Carl Suneson, Darren Prosser, Ricky Willison
1987: Ireland: Neil Anderson, Pádraig Hogan, Garth McGimpsey, John McHenry, Liam McNamara, Eoghan O'Connell
1985: Scotland: Cecil Bloice, Ian Brotherston, George Macgregor, Angus Moir, Colin Montgomerie, Sandy Stephen
1983: Ireland: John Carr, Tom Cleary, Garth McGimpsey, Mick Morris, Arthur Pierce, Philip Walton
1981: England: Roger Chapman, Peter Deeble, Paul Downes, Geoffrey Godwin, Peter McEvoy, Paul Way
1979: England: Ian Bradshaw, Peter Deeble, Paul Downes, Geoffrey Godwin, Michael Kelley, Peter McEvoy
1977: Scotland: Allan Brodie, Iain Carslaw, Charlie Green, Ian Hutcheon, Steve Martin, Gordon Murray
1975: Scotland: Charlie Green, Ian Hutcheon, George Macgregor, Gordon Murray, Sandy Stephen, Hugh Stuart
1973: England: John Davies, Rodney Foster, Peter Hedges, Trevor Homer, Michael King, Roger Revell
1971: England: Michael Bonallack, Rodney Foster, Warren Humphreys, Michael King, Geoff Marks, David Marsh
1969: England: Peter Benka, Michael Bonallack, Bruce Critchley, Rodney Foster, Geoff Marks, Peter Tupling
1967: Ireland: Joe Carr, Tom Craddock, Tom Egan, Peter Flaherty, Vincent Nevin, David Sheahan
1965: Ireland Joe Carr, Tom Craddock, Michael Craigan, Bill McCrea, Vincent Nevin, David Sheahan, Rupert Staunton
1963: England: Michael Bonallack, Michael Burgess, Rodney Foster, Peter Green, David Moffat, David Palmer, Alan Thirlwell
1961: Sweden: Johny Anderson, Gustaf Adolf Bielke, Ola Bergqvist, Gunnar Carlander, Lennart Leinborn, Magnus Lindberg, Bengt Möller
1959: Sweden: Ola Bergqvist, Gustaf Adolf Bielke, Gunnar Carlander, Per-Olof Johansson, Göran Lindeblad, Bengt Möller, Nils Odqvist (captain who played as stand in for players who were ill), Elis Werkell

Sources:

See also
Eisenhower Trophy – biennial world amateur team golf championship for men organized by the International Golf Federation.
European Amateur Championship – European amateur individual golf championship for men organised by the European Golf Association.
European Ladies' Team Championship – European amateur team golf championship for women organised by the European Golf Association.

References

External links
European Golf Association: Full results

 
Amateur golf tournaments
Team golf tournaments
Golf tournaments in Europe
Recurring sporting events established in 1959